The Legendary Demos is a compilation album by pop rock artist Carole King. It was released on April 24, 2012 on Hear Music. The album contains thirteen demo recordings, ranging in time from "Crying in the Rain" (1962) to six tracks that appeared on King's 1971 hit album Tapestry.

Track listing
 "Pleasant Valley Sunday" (Carole King, Gerry Goffin) - 2:26
 "So Goes Love" (Carole King, Gerry Goffin) - 2:52
 "Take Good Care of My Baby" (Carole King, Gerry Goffin) - 2:17
 "(You Make Me Feel Like) A Natural Woman" (Carole King, Gerry Goffin, Jerry Wexler) - 2:51
 "Like Little Children" (Carole King, Gerry Goffin) - 3:12
 "Beautiful" (Carole King) - 2:23
 "Crying in the Rain" (Carole King, Howard Greenfield) - 1:48
 "Way Over Yonder" (Carole King) - 3:24
 "Yours Until Tomorrow" (Carole King, Gerry Goffin) - 3:16
 "It's Too Late" (Carole King, Toni Stern) - 3:29
 "Tapestry" (Carole King) - 3:00
 "Just Once in My Life" (Carole King, Gerry Goffin, Phil Spector) - 4:02
 "You've Got a Friend" (Carole King) - 4:09

Charts

References

2012 compilation albums
Carole King albums
Demo albums
Hear Music compilation albums